Grange Hall (also Deer Creek) is an unincorporated community in Pickaway County, Ohio, United States.

Notes

Unincorporated communities in Pickaway County, Ohio
Unincorporated communities in Ohio